Stacy Roiall (born 14 May 1977 in Auckland, New Zealand) is a New Zealand-born Australian sport shooter. She won two medals (gold and bronze) in the women's trap at the 2004 ISSF World Cup in Sydney, Australia, and at the 2005 ISSF World Cup in Rome, Italy, with scores of 94 and 86 targets, respectively. She also captured a gold medal in the same discipline, along with her partner Laetischa Scanlan, at the 2010 Commonwealth Games in Delhi, India, setting a new games record of 93 clay pigeons.

Roiall represented her adopted nation Australia at the 2008 Summer Olympics in Beijing, where she competed in women's trap shooting. She finished only in fourteenth place by one point behind France's Delphine Racinet from the final attempt, for a total score of 62 targets.

References

External links
Profile – Australian Olympic Team
NBC 2008 Olympics profile

Australian female sport shooters
Trap and double trap shooters
Living people
Olympic shooters of Australia
Shooters at the 2008 Summer Olympics
Shooters at the 2010 Commonwealth Games
Commonwealth Games gold medallists for Australia
New Zealand emigrants to Australia
Sportspeople from Auckland
Sportspeople from Melbourne
1977 births
Commonwealth Games medallists in shooting
Medallists at the 2010 Commonwealth Games